Along with the Gods: The Two Worlds is a 2017 South Korean fantasy action film directed by Kim Yong-hwa and based on the webtoon series by Joo Ho-min, Along with the Gods. It stars Ha Jung-woo, Cha Tae-hyun, Ju Ji-hoon and Kim Hyang-gi.

The film was shot as one but presented in two parts. The first part,  Along with the Gods: The Two Worlds, was released on 20 December 2017. In June 2018, it was announced that another two sequels are scheduled to be filmed in 2019. The sequel, titled Along with the Gods: The Last 49 Days, was released on 1 August 2018.

As of May 2019, Along with the Gods: The Two Worlds is the third highest-grossing film in South Korean cinema history.

Plot 
Firefighter Kim Ja-hong (Cha Tae-hyun) dies in the line of duty and is escorted to the afterlife by three guardians: Hae Won-maek (Ju Ji-hoon), Lee Deok-choon (Kim Hyang-gi) and their leader Gang-rim (Ha Jung-woo). They are to escort and defend him in seven trials in 49 days. If he passes, he will be reincarnated and his guardians will be given credit towards their own reincarnation.

In the first court, Hell of Murder, Ja-hong is tried for the indirect murder of his colleague, who was trapped beneath rubble during a fire. About to be sentenced, it is revealed that his colleague told him to prioritize the civilians. After rescuing 8 others, Ja-hong attempted to go back for his colleague only to be held back as the building collapsed. The judge then acquits Ja-hong.

In the 2nd court, Hell of Indolence, Ja-hong's guardians presented his selflessness and diligence. Ja-hong blurts out that he only worked for money and was about to be punished when Gang-rim interjects, stating that the money was to support his brother and ailing mother and therefore acquitting him.

On the way to the Hell of Deceit, ghouls attack as the physics of Hell begins to morph. This change indicates that a member of Ja-hong's family had died and become a vengeful spirit. Gang-rim leaves the party to investigate as the rest proceeds. In the Hell of Deceit, Ja-hong is accused of writing fake letters to the family of those who had died, one of whom is Ji-yeon, the daughter of his fallen colleague. Gang-rim supernaturally links with Deok-choon from the living world to defend Ja-hong, stating that Ja-hong had also written fake letters to his mom to cheer her up, allowing her to focus on her health. And that the letters to Ji-Yeon, despite her actually understanding that her father was dead, helped her cope with her loss. The evidence is thrown out and the charges are dismissed.

Gang-rim determines that it is Ja-hong's brother Soo-hong who has become the vengeful spirit. He finds that Soo-hong has been accidentally killed while on guard duty by his partner Dong-yeon, and his death was covered up by their superior, Lieutenant Park. Gang-rim foils an attempt by Soo-hong to kill Dong-yeon and learns that the Soo-hong's grudge was not against Ja-hong but rather Dong-yeon and Lt Park. Dong-Yeon tips off Soo-hong's mother on the location of his body and attempts suicide. He is saved by Gang-Rim on Soo-hong's request after the latter agreed to cooperate.

The trio pass through the Hells of Injustice and Betrayal without trial. In the Hell of Violence, Ja-hong is tried for beating Soo-hong when they were younger while the latter was suffering from malnutrition. As Ja-hong was not forgiven, he is convicted and is about to be punished when Gang-Rim instructs Deok-choon to request for a combined trial at the next court, the Hell of Filial Impiety. The request is granted. Ja-hong reveals that, due to poverty, he intended to commit familicide but was discovered by Soo-hong. In a fit, he beat up Soo-hong and fled out of guilt, opting not to be a burden and dedicate his life to supporting them.

Gang-rim and Soo-hong arrive at the army base only to witness the mother's shabby treatment at the hands of Lt Park. Enraged, Soo-hong transforms back into a vengeful spirit and lashes out at the base by conjuring up a massive tornado, only stopping when he realizes how his actions are affecting Ja-hong in the afterlife.

At the Hell of Filial Impiety, Ja-hong is immediately judged by Yeomra to be guilty. He learns that on the night of his attempted murder-suicide, his mother was actually awake and had decided to allow it, knowing that she was a burden on her family. Soo-hong, with the help of Gang-rim and Won-maek, enters his mother's dream and learns that she had already forgiven Ja-hong for that night. Since sins that have been forgiven in the living world are not allowed to be judged in the afterlife, Ja-hong is allowed to reincarnate.

Afterward, Gang-rim realizes that Yeomra had been meddling with his investigation of Soo-hong. He decides to confront Yeomra directly and chooses Soo-hong as the group's final soul before their own reincarnation.

Cast

Main 
 Ha Jung-woo as Gang-rim
 Cha Tae-hyun as Kim Ja-hong
 Ju Ji-hoon as Haewonmak
 Kim Hyang-gi as Lee Deok-choon

Supporting 

 Kim Dong-wook as Kim Soo-hong
 Doh Kyung-soo as Private Won Dong-yeon
 Jang Gwang as Jingwang, God of Violence Hell
 Jung Hae-kyun as Byeonseong, God of Murder Hell
 Oh Dal-su as Prosecutor
 Im Won-hee as Prosecutor
 Lee Joon-hyuk as First Lieutenant Park Moo-shin
 Kim Su-an as Taesan
 Kang Da-hyun as Ji-yeon
 Yoon Ji-on as Soo-hong's legionnaire
 Ye Soo-jung as Ja-hong's mother
 Jung Ji-hoon as Heo Hyun-dong
 Nam Il-woo as Heo Choon-sam
 Oh Hee-joon as Interpreter soldier
 Sung Yu-bin as young Ja-hong
 Goo Seung-hyun as young Soo-hong
 Kim Keu-rim as First Lieutenant Park's wife
 Jung A-mi as Kang Rim-moo

Special appearance 
 Yoo Jun-sang as Ja-hong's fellow firefighter
 Lee Jung-jae as Yeomra
 Kim Su-ro as girl's father
 Kim Ha-neul as Songje, God of Betrayal Hell
 Kim Hae-sook as Chogang, God of Indolence Hell
 Lee Geung-young as Ogwan, Great King of the Senses
 Kim Min-jong as Afterlife Messenger
 Ma Dong-seok as Seongju

Production 
 Along with the Gods took  (around ) to produce. Both parts of the film were shot simultaneously. Dexter Studios, one of Asia's largest film production and visual effects studios, who was behind director Kim Yong-hwa's previous film Mr. Go (2013), created the visual effects for the film. It was reported that around 300 artists and technicians took part in the film's production.
 Chinese production company Alpha Pictures invested $2.2 million.
 Filming began on 26 May 2016 and ended on 22 March 2017.

Release 
Along with the Gods: The Two Worlds was released in the Korean cinemas on 20 December 2017. The film was pre-sold to 12 countries and regions including: Taiwan, Hong Kong, Macau, Singapore, Malaysia, Indonesia, Brunei, the Philippines, Cambodia, Laos, the U.S and Canada at the Asian Film Market in Busan. Further to that, the film was pre-sold to another 90 countries at the American Film Market (AFM) in Santa Monica, California, U.S.A, increasing the number of countries released to 103 in total.

South Korea 
Upon its release in the theaters, the film attracted 422,339 viewers on its first day and topped the box office with nearly  gross.

As of 3 January 2018, the film attracted 10 million viewers in just 15 days.

By 10 February 2018, Along with the Gods: The Two Worlds grossed more than US$105 million and became the second highest-grossing film in South Korea.

Taiwan 
Upon its release in the theaters in Taiwan on 22 December 2017, the film grossed NT$5 million. In the first week of its release, the film grossed NT$30 million, topping the weekend box office and became the second highest-grossing Korean film of all time in Taiwan. After a week of its release, the film grossed NT$50 million. On the 10th day of its release, the film grossed NT$100 million. On 16 January 2018, the film overtook Train to Busan to become the highest-grossing Korean film in Taiwan, after grossing near to NT$350 million. A month after its release in Taiwan, the film grossed NT$404 million.

Hong Kong 
Prior to the official release of the film, the film grossed HK$2.4 million from preview tickets sales. In the first day of its official release, the film grossed HK$5 million. As of 14 January, the film attracted more than 280,000 viewers and grossed HK$12.5 million. As of 16 January, the film grossed more than HK$16 million, surpassing The Battleship Island to become the second highest-grossing Korean film in Hong Kong. As of 28 January, the film grossed more than HK$40 million.

Adaptation 
On 28 December 2017, Realies Pictures, the production company of Along with the Gods: The Two Worlds, announced a television adaptation of the film. According to the company, the script will be written in 2018, and the drama would be produced in 2019.

Awards and nominations

References

External links 
 
 
 Along with the Gods: The Two Worlds at Naver

2017 films
2010s fantasy action films
2017 action drama films
2010s Korean-language films
Films based on South Korean webtoons
Lotte Entertainment films
South Korean fantasy films
South Korean action drama films
Films about the afterlife
Films about firefighting
South Korean courtroom films
Films about personifications of death
Films directed by Kim Yong-hwa
Live-action films based on comics
2010s fantasy drama films
2010s South Korean films